The 2021 I-League Qualifiers or Hero I-League Qualifiers 2021 (for sponsorship reasons) was the 14th season of I-League 2nd Division since its establishment in 2008. The league winner secured place in 2021–22 I-League season.

Subrata Dutta, senior vice president of All India Football Federation, and AIFF league committee members held its meeting on June 26, 2021, agreeing that state associations which have conducted a league or qualifying championship, will be eligible to nominate teams for the qualifiers.

Even though states are allowed to nominate two teams, the AIFF said each state association will be represented by just one team in I-League qualifiers. The AIFF has made it clear that only those states which conduct a league will be allowed to nominate a team. At least two states made direct recommendations, but were turned down. AIFF allowed relaxation in case nominated clubs couldn't meet the financial criteria to play in I-League, if they were promoted.

On 4th December 2021, AIFF barred I-League club Chennai City FC from participating in 2021–22 season on failing to comply with club licensing regulations, and hence second-placed qualifiers team Kenkre FC was promoted.

Teams
As per AIFF, ten teams will be selected to participate in I-League 2nd Division qualifiers, through State leagues. Only one team among the nominated two teams from each state will be selected.

Selection criteria 
 State association can nominate up to two teams based on the conducted qualifying tournament in most recent season.
 Nominated teams shall meet AIFF financial requirements and be liable to complete club licensing criteria.

Nominated teams 
The following teams were nominated by state associations:

 Vizag FC (Andhra Pradesh)
 Oil India FC, Elevenstar Club (Assam)
 Shirsh Bihar United FC (Bihar)
 Indian Heroes Daman and Diu FC, Young Hearts FC (Daman and Diu)
 Sports Hostel Cuttack (Odisha)
 Delhi FC, Garhwal FC (Delhi)
 Vasco SC (Goa)
 Gandhinagar FC, ARA FC (Gujarat)
 Techtro Swades United FC, Shimla FC (Himachal Pradesh)
 Peerless SC, Bhawanipore FC (West Bengal)
 Hyderya Sports FC, Downtown Heroes FC (Jammu and Kashmir)
 Kerala United FC, BASCO Othukkungal (Kerala)
 FC Bengaluru United, Kickstart FC (Karnataka)
 Madan Maharaj FC (Madhya Pradesh)
 Ryntih FC (Meghalaya)
 Rajasthan United FC, Zinc Football (Rajasthan)
 Corbett FC (Uttarakhand)
 PIFA Sports FC, Kenkre FC (Maharashtra)

Selected teams 

29 teams were nominated by 18 state associations. Only twelve teams fulfilled the AIFF criteria, and ten teams were accepted for the season. Later AIFF decided to withdraw Hyderya Sports FC, runners up of Jammu & Kashmir Professional League, after finding the bank guarantee submitted by them to be not genuine.

Personnel and kits

Foreign players 
Each club could register up to three foreign players in their squad. One of the foreign players had to be from an AFC member nation.

Format 
The ten participating teams have been divided into two groups of five. They will face each other once in the first league leg.

Teams finishing at the top two group positions will proceed to the Final round, where they will play against each other once in a round-robin format. The team that finishes top after the end of 26 matches, will earn promotion to the Hero I-League 2021–22 season.

26 matches are set to be played in the entire tournament, with 20 of them being in the group stage, while six matches will be played in the Final round.

The total number of teams was reduced to nine, after Hyderya Sports FC was found to have produced fake bank guarantee documents.

Preliminary round

Group A

Group B

Finals

Standings

Matches

Statistics

Top scorers

References

External links 
I-League
AIFF

I-League 2nd Division seasons
I-League 2nd Division